The 1915 FA Cup final took place on 24 April 1915 and was contested by Sheffield United and Chelsea.  It was the last FA Cup final to be staged before competitive football was suspended in Britain because of the First World War. The match was moved from its pre-war location of Crystal Palace in south London to Old Trafford in Manchester to avoid disruption to travel in and around London.

The match is one of the few FA Cup Finals that has acquired a name; the "Khaki Cup Final", owing to the large number of uniformed soldiers in attendance. However, the attendance of about 50,000 was lower than previous years as a result of wartime travel restriction and the mobilisation of large numbers of young men into the armed forces.

Road to the Final
Chelsea had the easiest start in the FA Cup competition, their first round match was with Swindon Town, a Southern Football League team, but they made heavy work of it requiring a replay to defeat them and conceding 3 goals during the two matches. Their Cup performance improved considerably, and after defeating Arsenal (then a Second Division side) in the second round, they defeated several First Division sides who finished above them in the league table, including Everton who later went on to win the league that season.

Sheffield United defeated Blackpool, a second division side, in the first round and then made steady progress until round 4 where they met Oldham Athletic, who finished above them in the First Division that season, and they required a replay to finally defeat them. Sheffield United met Bolton Wanderers in the semi-final and Utley, the Blades' Captain, scored a rare goal.

Pre-match build-up
The favourites to win the match were Sheffield United. They had combined a successful FA Cup run with a strong league campaign where they finished 6th overall but only three points behind the League winners.  Their defence was one of the best in the league but they had not managed to score many goals.

Chelsea were statistically the weaker side, whilst they had scored more goals than Sheffield United in the league, their defence was poor and they had conceded many more and lay in the relegation zone. They had however beaten several strong clubs away from home during the FA Cup competition and the programme noted that the underdogs had won on six occasions in the previous ten years.

Chelsea also had injury problems: Bob Thomson, their leading goal scorer that season, had been injured in a league game at Bolton Wanderers ten days earlier and was doubtful. Vivian Woodward an amateur and England international who played for Chelsea in peacetime but was currently serving in the British Army, had been given leave to play in the final. However Woodward sportingly insisted that as Thomson had helped the club reach the final, he ought to play in it. There was bad news when Thomson suffered an eye injury, but he played.

Match programme
The official match programme was produced by Manchester United. A special version was printed on silk for presentation to the players and officials.

The programme showed that both teams played a 2–3–5 formation and the Chelsea teamsheet listed Vivian Woodward and Laurence Abrams in addition to those who played in the match. Neither played in the match.

Match summary

As the score line suggests, the match was very much a one-sided affair. Chelsea adopted a gentlemanly "Drawing Room" style of play with attacks made up of zig-zag passes. These were broken up by an alert and cooperative Sheffield United defence. The Sheffield United forwards, with their superior tactics, pace and fitness, had the run of the Chelsea half and only the excellent performance of Molyneux, in goal for Chelsea, saved them from further embarrassment.  Contemporary reports
singled out Brelsford, Simmons and Utley of Sheffield United for their quality of their performances during the match and Logan, who made some unsuccessful attacks for Chelsea during the second half.

The first goal was scored by Simmons just before half-time. A ball in from the left hand side crossed over the Chelsea backs and Simmons, racing in from the right half, half-volleyed it into the top of the net. Some sources suggest that Molyneux should have stopped this goal but others state that he was let down by his defence in all three goals. Chelsea had their best chances just before half-time when they had two shots saved by Gough in the Blades' goal.

At some point Chelsea woes were added to when Harry Ford on the right wing was injured.

Play was muted at the start of the second half as a thick fog descended over the pitch, preventing spectators from seeing any action on the opposite side of the pitch, though The Times commented that they were not missing much.  The final two goals were scored in the last ten minutes. A shot from Wally Masterman rebounded from the bar but Fazackerly headed it past the Chelsea keeper for United's second.  Directly after this goal Joe Kitchen picked the ball up just inside the Chelsea half and passed two defenders.  Molyneaux emerged from the Chelsea goal but Kitchen dodged him and placed the ball in the open net. At this point, before the final whistle, large numbers of the spectators began to leave.

The crowd included many men in uniform but a much larger contingent who, the Manchester Guardian commented, should have been in uniform. A number of wounded soldiers, one missing an arm, watched the match from lower stand.

The cup was awarded by the Earl of Derby whose speech, largely drowned out by a noisy crowd of young supporters, noted that all present needed to join together and play "a sterner game for England".

The Irwell Old Prize band provided the half time entertainment, playing a selection of tunes from around the British Isles. A collection was made during the match on behalf of the British Red Cross.

Match details

Aftermath
In July 1915, the Football League put all players on amateur status and clubs were only allowed to pay expenses. Attendances at matches collapsed and as fuel for transport became scarce the national league was abandoned and football teams played in regional leagues with whatever players they could find. Chelsea often played with players from other sides who passed through London whilst on active service, including Stanley Fazackerley.

Sheffield United held the FA Cup until it was contested again in 1920. They reached the final and won the cup again in 1925.

Chelsea did not reach the final again until 1967 and finally won it in 1970 at Old Trafford in a replay 55 years later.

References

External links

Match report at www.fa-cupfinals.co.uk
FA Cup Final lineups 
FA Cup Final kits

1915
FA
1910s in Manchester
Sheffield United F.C. matches
Chelsea F.C. matches
April 1915 sports events
Sports competitions in Manchester